Joseph William Noble (1799 – 6 January 1861) was a British Liberal politician.

Noble was a highly respected local medical practitioner who was elected Liberal MP for Leicester at the 1859 general election with a majority of 20 votes. He held the seat until his death in 1861.

References

External links
 

UK MPs 1859–1865
1799 births
1861 deaths
Liberal Party (UK) MPs for English constituencies